Sotirios "Soto" Karapostolou (alternate spelling: Sotiris) (Greek: Σωτηρης "Σωτω" Καραποστολου; born July 15, 1978) is a Greek former professional basketball player and current basketball assistant coach. During his playing days, he was a 1.96 m (6 ft 5 in) tall shooting guard-small forward.

College career
Karapostolou played college basketball at Southern New Hampshire University. He was inducted into the school's athletic hall of fame in 2009.

Professional career
In his pro career, Karapostolou has played with the following clubs: Artland Dragons, Aris, Makedonikos, Panellinios, Rethymno, Keravnos, Olympia Larissa, Iraklis, and Kavala. He returned to Kavala in 2013, after having previously played with the club.

Coaching career
In the summer of 2021, Karapostolou became an assistant coach for Iraklis Thessaloniki, under coach Thanasis Skourtopoulos. In 2022, he moved to Aris, under coach Giannis Kastritis.

References

External links
Eurocup Profile
FIBA Profile
Eurobasket.com Profile
Greek Basket League Profile
Draftexpress.com Profile

1978 births
Living people
Aris B.C. players
Aris B.C. coaches
Artland Dragons players
Greek men's basketball players
Greek expatriate basketball people in the United States
Iraklis Thessaloniki B.C. players
Iraklis Thessaloniki B.C. coaches
Kavala B.C. players
Keravnos B.C. players
Makedonikos B.C. players
Olympia Larissa B.C. players
Panellinios B.C. players
Rethymno B.C. players
Shooting guards
Small forwards
Southern New Hampshire Penmen men's basketball players
Basketball players from Larissa